María José Martínez and Anabel Medina Garrigues won in the final 6–4, 6–7(5–7), 7–5 against Virginia Ruano Pascual and Paola Suárez.

Seeds
Champion seeds are indicated in bold text while text in italics indicates the round in which those seeds were eliminated.

 Virginia Ruano Pascual /  Paola Suárez (final)
 Amanda Coetzer /  Corina Morariu (quarterfinals)
 Tina Križan /  Katarina Srebotnik (semifinals)
 Tathiana Garbin /  Janette Husárová (quarterfinals)

Draw

Qualifying

Seeds

Qualifiers
  María José Martínez /  Anabel Medina Garrigues

Qualifying draw

References
 2001 Abierto Mexicano Pegaso Women's Doubles Draw (International Tennis Federation)

Doubles
2001 Abierto Mexicano Pegaso